The 1997 World Doubles Cup was a tennis tournament played on outdoor clay courts at the Craiglockhart Tennis Centre in Edinburgh in Scotland that was part of the 1997 WTA Tour. The tournament was held from 21 May through 24 May 1997.

Winners

Women's doubles

 Nicole Arendt /  Manon Bollegraf defeated  Rachel McQuillan /  Nana Miyagi 6–1, 3–6, 7–5
 It was Arendt's 3rd title of the year and the 12th of her career. It was Bollegraf's 3rd title of the year and the 26th of her career.

World Doubles Cup
WTA Doubles Championships
World Doubles Cup
1997 in Scottish sport